Drum Hill Branch is a stream in St. Clair County in the U.S. state of Illinois. It is a tributary of the Kaskaskia River.

According to tradition, Drum Hill Branch received its name from the regular drum rolls performed by a local settler.

See also
List of rivers of Illinois

References

Rivers of St. Clair County, Illinois
Rivers of Illinois